Muhammad al-Maghout (1934–April 3, 2006) was a renowned Syrian writer and poet.

He was born in the town of Salamiyah of Hama Governorate in Syria to an Isma'ili family. He was married to the poet Saniya Salih.

Muhammad Maghout was credited as the father of the Arabic free verse poetry, liberating the Arabic poems from the traditional form and revolutionizing the structure of the poem. 
He penned his first poems on cigarette papers while in prison in the 1950s, he wrote it as his personal memoir of the prison experience later to be discovered as revolutionary poetry. Without formal education, he tapped into his vivid imagination, innate mastery of words and intuition in his future work.      
He wrote for theater, TV and cinema. Maghout's work combined satire with descriptions of social misery and malaise, and what he viewed as an ethical decline among rulers in the region. Some of his themes included the problems of injustice and totalitarian governments. The struggles of the marginalized was at the heart of all his work. His first theatrical production " The Hunchback bird" was originally a long poem that he wrote while in hiding in a small low ceiling room. A dialogue emerged within the poem transforming it to his first theatrical production. This was followed by another play "The Clown" played by the renowned lebanese actor Antoin Kerbaj. He co-operated with Syrian actors Dureid Lahham and Nihad Qal'i to produce some of the region's most popular and acclaimed theatrical works, such as Kasak ya Watan (Toast to the homeland) and Ghorbeh (Estrangement) and "Dayat Tishreen" (October's Village).

Al-Maghout was also known for his book "I will betray my homeland", a collection of columns concerned with the dream of freedom.

Al-Maghout died at the age of 72 in April 2006.

Quotes 
"Policemen, Interpol men everywhere; you search for the perfect crime... there is only one perfect crime; to be born an Arab."

"I am the one who has not been killed yet at war, by earthquake or street accident."

Works

Poetry
 1959: Sadness in the moonlight (Huzn fi daw when qamar)
 1964: A room with millions of walls (Gurfa bi malayin al-judrán)
 1970: Joy is not my profession (Al-farah laysa mihnati)
 2001: The rose slayer ("Sayaf al-zohour")
 2005: East of Eden, West of God (" Sharq Adan, Gharb alaah")
 2006: The red bedouin ("Al-badawi al-ahmar")

Books
 I will betray my homeland "Sa akhoun watani" A best seller collection of essays that transcends time and location
 The rape of "Kana" and her sisters "Ightisab kana wa akhawateha" is a collection of quotes and interviews by Al-Maghout. (Kana and her sisters are Arabic words that dictate the case of words following them.)

Theater
 The hunchback bird (Al-ousfour al ahdab)
 The clown (Al-Mouharej)
 Tishreen's village (Dayat tishreen)
 Exile (Ghorbeh)
 Cheers Nation (Kasak ya watan)
 The Poppy Anemone (Shaqaeq al-nomaan)
 Outside the flock (kharej al-sareb)

TV
 The night tales (Hakaya al-lyl)
 Where is the mistake (Wayn al-ghalat)
 The musk valley (wady al misk)

Movies
 The borders (Al-hodoud )
 The report (Al-taqreer)

Translations
 Joy is not My Profession, translated by John Asfour and Alison Burch (Signal Editions, Montreal, 1994)

Awards 
 2005: Prize for Poetry – Al Owais Award, administered by the Sultan Bin Ali Al Owais Cultural Foundation.
 2000: Medal of the Experimental Theater – Cairo.
 1973: Prize of Said Aql of Theater.
 1950: Prize For Poetry – An-Nahar Newspaper.

References

Further reading 

 Kociejowski, Marius "The Street Philosopher and the Holy Fool: A Syrian Journey" (Sutton, 2004; new edition by Eland Books in 2016) contains an account of a meeting with the poet pp. 216–224

External links 
 Arab literary giant Mohammad al-Maghout dies 
 Farewell Mohammad al-Maghout
 Interview with Mohammad Al-Maghout: Early 2004
 Mohammed Al-Maghout: The Syrian Poet with a Satiric Pen
 The life of a little-known Syrian poet

Syrian poets
Syrian Ismailis
1934 births
2006 deaths
20th-century poets